Beaver Creek is an unincorporated community and census-designated place (CDP) in Burleson County, Texas, United States.  It was first listed as a CDP in the 2020 census with a population of 910.

References 

Populated places in Burleson County, Texas
Census-designated places in Burleson County, Texas
Census-designated places in Texas